"The Summer Is Magic" is a song by Italian Eurodance group Playahitty, released in July 1994 as their debut single. The lead vocals are performed by Italian singer Giovanna Bersola, as she did for the 1993 hit "The Rhythm of the Night" by Corona. This led to the mistaken belief that "The Summer Is Magic" was another hit song by Corona. The song hit the charts in the summer and autumn of 1994 in several countries of Continental Europe, such as Italy, where it reached number two on the Top 40 singles chart. It reached the top 40 also in Argentina, Austria, Brazil, Colombia, Denmark, France, Germany, Mexico, the Netherlands, Spain, Sweden and Switzerland. A partly black-and-white music video was produced to promote the single.

Critical reception
Pan-European magazine Music & Media wrote, "Just at the moment when summer is over, this Euro dance single with the voice of Corona brings back memories of your holiday in Italy better than any photo album could ever do."

Chart performance
"The Summer Is Magic" was a major hit on the charts in Europe. It peaked at number two in Italy and was a top 20 hit in Austria, Denmark, Spain and Switzerland . Additionally, it entered the top 40 in the Netherlands, France, Germany and Sweden, as well as on the Eurochart Hot 100, where it reached number 36 in September 1994. It did not chart on the UK Singles Chart. Outside Europe, the single was successful in Israel, peaking at number seven and in Canada, where it hit number eight on the RPM Dance/Urban chart. It also charted in Argentina, Brazil, Colombia and Mexico.

Track listings

			
 7" single, Germany (1994)
 "The Summer is Magic" (Radio Mix) — 3:44
 "The Summer is Magic" (Acappella) — 3:39

 12" single, Italy (1994)
 "The Summer is Magic" (Gambrinus Club Mix) — 5:20
 "The Summer is Magic" (Acappella) — 3:39
 "The Summer is Magic" (Copa Cabana Beach Mix) — 5:31
 "The Summer is Magic" (Radio Mix) — 3:44

 CD single, France & Benelux (1994)
 "The Summer is Magic" (Radio Mix) — 3:55
 "The Summer is Magic" (Gambrinus Club Mix) — 5:20

 CD maxi-single, Europe (1994)
 "The Summer is Magic" (Gambrinus Club Mix) — 5:20
 "The Summer is Magic" (Acapella) — 3:39
 "The Summer is Magic" (Copa Cabana Beach Mix) — 5:31
 "The Summer is Magic" (Radio Mix) — 3:44

 CD maxi-single - Remix, Germany (1994)
 "The Summer is Magic" (Alex Party Mix) — 3:57
 "The Summer is Magic" (Alex Party Heavy Mix) — 5:00
 "The Summer is Magic" (D.J. Herbie Mixa Mixa) — 6:26
 "The Summer is Magic" (Original Radio Mix) — 3:44

Charts

Weekly charts

Year-end charts

Cover versions

References

1994 debut singles
1994 songs
Playahitty songs